Amfetaminil (also known as amphetaminil, N-cyanobenzylamphetamine, and AN-1; brand name Aponeuron) is a stimulant drug derived from amphetamine, which was developed in the 1970s and used for the treatment of obesity, ADHD, and narcolepsy. It has largely been withdrawn from clinical use following problems with abuse. The drug is a prodrug to amphetamine.

Stereochemistry 
Amfetaminil is a molecule with two stereogenic centers. Thus, four different stereoisomers exist:

 (R)-2-[(R)-1-Phenylpropan-2-ylamino]-2-phenylacetonitrile (CAS number 478392-08-4)
 (S)-2-[(S)-1-Phenylpropan-2-ylamino]-2-phenylacetonitrile (CAS number 478392-12-0)
 (R)-2-[(S)-1-Phenylpropan-2-ylamino]-2-phenylacetonitrile (CAS number 478392-10-4)
 (S)-2-[(R)-1-Phenylpropan-2-ylamino]-2-phenylacetonitrile (CAS number 478392-14-2)

References 

Substituted amphetamines
Nitriles
Norepinephrine-dopamine releasing agents
Prodrugs
World Anti-Doping Agency prohibited substances